Rinaa Shah is the first Indian woman professional polo player and a fashion entrepreneur and electronic drummer and DJ.

Personal life
Shah played for the Umaid Bhavan polo Cup, The International Ladies tournament and won the HERMES cup in Jodhpur 2015 December and The Trunks Company polo Cup in 2017.

Career

Rinaldi Polo
Shah owns a polo team named Rinaldi polo which won he MG & G Area Polo Cup in 2014 and the 2017 Trunks company Polo Cup.

Fashion design
Shah launched the fashion label "Rinaldi Designs" in 1997.

References

Living people
Indian polo players
Year of birth missing (living people)